James C. Weaver (March 5, 1945 – July 2, 2015) was an American college football player and coach and college athletics administrator. He was the head football coach at Villanova University for the first eight games of the 1974 season, compiling a record of 3–5. Weaver was the athletic director at the University of Nevada, Las Vegas (UNLV) from 1991 to 1994, Western Michigan University from 1996 to 1997, and Virginia Tech from 1997 to 2014.

Career
A native of Harrisburg, Pennsylvania, Weaver played college football at Pennsylvania State University for Rip Engle and Joe Paterno and was later an assistant coach under Paterno, from 1967 to 1972. After a spending 1973 as the offensive coordinator at Iowa State University, Weaver was hired as the head football coach at Villanova University, succeeding Lou Ferry, who stayed with a team as defensive line coach. Weaver led Villanova to a record of 3–5 before he was hired in early November 1974, after the disclosure of his intentions to quit at the end of the season and take an administrative position at Clarion State College. Ferry assumed the role of interim head coach for the last three games of the season.

In 1983, Weaver was hired by the University of Florida athletics department in the wake of that school's NCAA sanctions. From there, he moved on the University of Nevada, Las Vegas (UNLV) to become the director of athletics in 1991. Weaver resigned in 1994 in protest over the hiring of Tim Grgurich, who had been an assistant under the controversial Jerry Tarkanian, to be the school's new men's basketball coach.

Following a short stay as Western Michigan University's director of athletics, Weaver was hired by Virginia Tech to replace the departing Dave Braine. Under Weaver, Virginia Tech's athletics programs moved from the Atlantic 10 Conference to the Big East Conference and then to the Atlantic Coast Conference. Lane Stadium was expanded twice, in 2002 and 2005. His accomplishments on behalf of the university led to his posthumous enshrinement into the Virginia Tech Sports Hall of Fame. 

Weaver retiring due to health concerns in 2014 and was succeeded by Whit Babcock.

Death
Weaver died on July 2, 2015 at the age of 70. He had Parkinson's disease.

Head coaching record

Notes

References

2015 deaths
1945 births
Florida Gators athletic directors
Iowa State Cyclones football coaches
Penn State Nittany Lions football players
Penn State Nittany Lions football coaches
UNLV Rebels athletic directors
Villanova Wildcats football coaches
Virginia Tech Hokies athletic directors
Western Michigan Broncos athletic directors
Sportspeople from Harrisburg, Pennsylvania
Players of American football from Harrisburg, Pennsylvania
Neurological disease deaths in Virginia
Deaths from Parkinson's disease